Lee Hak-min (born 11 March 1991) is a South Korean footballer who plays as full back for Chungnam Asan FC in K League 2.

Career
He was selected by Gyeongnam FC in the 2014 K League draft and made his debut goal on 13 July 2014 in the league match against Jeonbuk.

References

External links 

1991 births
Living people
Association football fullbacks
South Korean footballers
Gyeongnam FC players
Bucheon FC 1995 players
Incheon United FC players
Seongnam FC players
Suwon FC players
K League 1 players
K League 2 players